The 2017 Red Bull Air Race of Lausitz was the sixth round of the 2017 Red Bull Air Race World Championship season, the twelfth season of the Red Bull Air Race World Championship. The event was held at the Lausitzring in the Brandenburg state of Germany.

Master Class

Qualification

Round of 14

  +0:03
  +0:02
  +0:04

Round of 8

Final 4

Final result

Challenger Class

Qualification

Results

Standings after the event

Master Class standings

Challenger Class standings

References

External links
 Lausitz Red Bull Air Race

|- style="text-align:center"
|width="35%"|Previous race:2017 Red Bull Air Race of Porto
|width="30%"|Red Bull Air Race2017 season
|width="35%"|Next race:2017 Red Bull Air Race of Indianapolis
|- style="text-align:center"
|width="35%"|Previous race:2016 Red Bull Air Race of Lausitz
|width="30%"|Red Bull Air Race of Lausitz
|width="35%"|Next race:2018 Red Bull Air Race of Lausitz
|- style="text-align:center"

Lausitz
Red Bull Air Race World Championship
Red Bull Air Race World Championship, Lausitz